Islington Mill is a six-storey Georgian mill building, located at 1 James Street, Ordsall, Salford, England. The name 'Islington Mill' is commonly used to refer to the wider collection of nineteenth and early twentieth century buildings that reside at this location, and to the Islington Mill Arts Club, which occupies those buildings.

Architecture 
Islington Mill was originally built for cotton spinning in 1823 by the self-taught Leeds-born architect David Bellhouse (1764–1840). Bellhouse's firm was also responsible for the construction of the Manchester Portico Library, of which Bellhouse was also a founding member, and the original Manchester Town Hall on King Street, designed by Francis Goodwin and later demolished.

A year after the original construction of Islington Mill there was a partial structural collapse of the building. During rebuilding, various new structures were added to the original model that had consisted of a single row of cast-iron columns. Further extensions were subsequently added over the years, including a second mill (which was also later rebuilt), stables around the courtyard and an external engine house. By the early 1900s the Mill was being used for textile doubling rather than spinning.

Islington Mill was granted a Grade II listing by English Heritage in November 1996, with the listed building ID number 471566.

Islington Mill Arts Club
In 1996, Bill Campbell took a lease on a single floor of the Mill. The upper stories of the main Mill had by this time been out of use for around 30 years. After a nine-month occupancy by Campbell, Islington Mill was put up for sale by the owners, and Campbell successfully raised funds to purchase it. The first art exhibitions took place at the Mill in 1999, with Campbell acquiring the freehold on the remainder of the building the following year. Since then, the interiors of the buildings have been gradually renovated and converted for multiple uses, including the conversion of the engine house into living space, by Campbell and architect David Britch. The Engine House now houses design studios and is also the name of the creative collective who operate from there.

Islington Mill operates as an independent arts venue under the name Islington Mill Arts Club with a self-described emphasis on experimentation, collaboration, artistic process and a deliberately non-traditional approach to the fostering of cross-disciplinary artistic talent. This approach draws influence from various avant-garde, not-for-profit and progressive movements, including punk, Situationism and Manchester's Hacienda nightclub. The Mill has a non-hierarchical operational and decision-making structure which places "nurturing, supporting and inspiring creativity, especially new and emerging talent, at the heart of everything it does".

To date, more than 1500 artists and makers have worked in spaces provided by Islington Mill and a diverse collection of artists, musicians, festivals and ventures have their origins in, or have been successfully fostered at, Islington Mill since its inception. These include artist Rachel Goodyear, band The Ting Tings, the "Sounds from the Other City" music festival, Video Jam collective, the experimental band Gnod, music festival Fat Out Fest and Islington Mill Art Academy (an experimental art education project founded in 2007). Islington Mill also hosted the first UK appearance of the American drag artiste Christeene Vale.

The present day structure of Islington Mill Arts Club is a multi-purpose, multi-occupancy collection of buildings, comprising numerous artist studios, educational spaces and galleries, as well as living accommodation, event and performance spaces, administrative offices, and studio and work spaces for a range of independently operated art, design and craft ventures.

There are currently four Directors of the Mill: founder Bill Campbell, artist Maurice Carlin, artist Rachel Goodyear, and trainer/consultant, Rivca Rubin.

Future development
In July 2014, Islington Mill announced the success of a three-year long capital funding application to Arts Council England for £1 million. The funding forms part of a larger £2.2 million project to safeguard the future of Islington Mill with a programme of major building improvements to include new artist-in-residence facilities and the renovation of a further 4,000 square ft of unused space.

In September 2020, Islington Mill announced they would receive £3.3m in funding, from the European Regional Development Fund. The funding will be used to purchase and renovate an adjacent site building called New Islington Mill to house artist studios, and to distribute training and grants for creatives and small businesses based in Salford.

The former industrial site adjacent to Islington Mill, Regent Trading Estate, now forms part of Islington Mill Arts Club and houses artist studios, exhibition and performance space.
The development of this site as a creative destination for Salford is described as 'The Other City', named after the long-running music festival that is operated from Islington Mill.

Islington Mill Foundation is due to launch in 2021 as the charitable arm of Islington Mill which will focus on artist development, mentoring, training and nurturing.

Renovations to the main Islington Mill building began in November 2020.

References

External links

Music venues in Greater Manchester
Art museums and galleries in Greater Manchester
Grade II listed buildings in the City of Salford